Saint Luis Rey is the name of a premium cigar brand in Cuba created in 1940 and  still produced there for Habanos S.A., the Cuban state-owned tobacco company.

History
The marca or brand San Luis Rey is believed to be based on a reference to the popular 1927 novel by American author Thornton Wilder, The Bridge of San Luis Rey. The brand itself was first registered in Cuba by the Zamora y Guerra Co., located at 810 Calle Maximo Gómez in Havana.  In 1940, the name Saint Luis Rey was registered by two English tobacco importers, Nathan Silverstone and Michael De Keyser. The Saint Luis Rey factory and its assets were nationalized by the Cuban government on September 15, 1960. From 1960 until 1992, the brand was marketed exclusively on the UK market by NR Silverstone Cigar Ltd. In 1993, Habanos S.A. began exporting this brand worldwide.

The brand is today produced at the Briones Montoto factory in Havana, where Romeo y Julieta cigars are produced.

Current production
All Cuban-production Saint Luis Rey cigars are completely handmade (totalmente a mano) from long-filler tobacco (Tripa Larga) sourced from the Vuelta Abajo (Pinar del Río) region of Cuba. The brand is particularly known for the Lonsdale size, which was a favorite of Frank Sinatra. Sancho Panza cigars are mild to medium-bodied in strength among Cuban cigars.

In the US, the Saint Luis Rey trademark was registered by Altadis.  In 2008, Altadis was acquired by the British tobacco giant Imperial Tobacco (now Imperial Brands).  Imperial now markets the Altadis USA line of non-Cuban cigars with the Saint Luis Rey brand name incorporating a blend of Honduran and Nicaraguan or Peruvian long filler tobaccos and a Nicaraguan binder and wrapper.

Hand-Made Vitolas
The range of sizes produced by Habanos S.A. today comprises several vitolas including the Molinos or 'mill', which is a Cervantes size. 
 Lonsdale	Vitola de Galera: Cervantes (Lonsdale)
Length: 165 mm (6 1/2") Ring Gauge: 42 (15.88 mm)	

 Coronas	Vitola de Galera: Coronas
Length: 142 mm (5 5/8") Ring Gauge: 42 (16.67 mm)

 Churchill	Vitola de Galera: Churchill
Length: 178 mm (7") Ring Gauge: 47 (18.65 mm)

Source: Habanos S.A.

References

Cigar brands
Cuban brands
Habanos S.A. brands